Prosetín is name of several locations in the Czech Republic:

 Prosetín (Chrudim District) in Pardubice Region 
 Prosetín (Žďár nad Sázavou) in Vysočina Region (Žďár nad Sázavou District)